Akmescit may refer to:

 Akmescit, Devrekani, a village in Turkey
 Akmescit, Koçarlı, a village in western Turkey
 Akmescit, Crimea, the name referring to Simferopol by the local Crimean Tatars